Chaleh Siah (also Romanized as Chāleh Sīāh; also known as Chāl Sīāh) is a village in Mian Band Rural District, in the Central District of Nur County, Mazandaran Province, Iran. At the 2006 census, its population was 92, in 21 families.

References 

Populated places in Nur County